Khak Vanaq (also Romanized as Khāk Vānaq and Khākvānaq; also known as Khāyfānā, Haifona, Hāyfoneh, Ḩeyf Ūnā, and Khayfana) is a village in Sina Rural District, in the Central District of Varzaqan County, East Azerbaijan Province, Iran. At the 2006 census, its population was 113, in 19 families.

References 

Towns and villages in Varzaqan County